Oregon Route 226 is an Oregon state highway that runs between a point east of Albany in the Willamette Valley, and the town of Mehama along the Santiam River. It lies mostly within Linn County, except for the very northernmost segment in Mehama, which is in Marion County.

Route description

Oregon Route 226 begins at its junction with U.S. Route 20, several miles east of Albany.  It heads in a general northeasterly direction, passing through the town of Scio, continuing to the east until it reaches the city of Lyons on the south bank of the Santiam River.  The highway then turns north, crossing the river into Mehama, and ending at an intersection with Oregon Route 22.

Major intersections

References

226
Transportation in Marion County, Oregon
Transportation in Linn County, Oregon